Brit Awards 1990  was the 10th edition of the Brit Awards, an annual pop music awards ceremony in the United Kingdom. It was organised by the British Phonographic Industry and took place on 18 February 1990. The ceremony was held at the Dominion Theatre in London for the first time, having previously been held at the Royal Albert Hall, and was hosted by Cathy McGowan.

Performances
Lisa Stansfield – "All Around the World"
Neneh Cherry – "Manchild"
Nigel Kennedy – Vivaldi's Four Seasons
Various Artists with appearance by The Cookie Crew – "The Brits 1990 (Dance Medley)"
Phil Collins – "Another Day in Paradise"
Soul II Soul – What Is Soul II Soul

Winners and nominees

Multiple nominations and awards
The following artists received multiple awards and/or nominations. don't counting Outstanding Contribution to Music.

Notable moments

Freddie Mercury
The 1990 Brit Awards saw the final public appearance of Queen frontman Freddie Mercury. Queen appeared at the ceremony to receive the Brit Award for Outstanding Contribution to British Music. Mercury – who had been suffering from AIDS since 1987 but had not yet disclosed it to the public – did not make a speech, as Brian May did the talking on behalf of the other members, but his gaunt appearance was noticeable. He briefly thanked the public and wished them goodnight before Queen left the stage. Mercury died in November 1991 from complications resulting from AIDS.

References

External links
Brit Awards 1990 at Brits.co.uk

Brit Awards
Brit Awards
Brit Awards
Brit Awards
Brit
Brit Awards